Ramón Darío Molina Jaramillo (31 August 1935 – 15 October 2018) was a Colombian Roman Catholic bishop.

Molina Jaramillo was born in Colombia and was ordained to the priesthood in 1961. He served as titular bishop of Timici and auxiliary bishop of the Roman Catholic Archdiocese of Bogotá, Colombia, from 1977 to 1984. He then served as bishop of the Roman Catholic Diocese of Montería from 1984 to 2001. He then served as bishop of the Roman Catholic Diocese of Neiva from 2001 to 2012.

Notes

1935 births
2018 deaths
20th-century Roman Catholic bishops in Colombia
21st-century Roman Catholic bishops in Colombia
People from Envigado
Roman Catholic bishops of Bogotá
Roman Catholic bishops of Neiva
Roman Catholic bishops of Montería